Anglo Singapore International School is an International School in Phra Khanong District, Bangkok, Thailand  established in 2003 that provides an education based on Singapore Curriculum Framework leading to the Cambridge IGCSE. The school is a member of International Schools Association of Thailand. It has three campuses. The first campus is situated at Sukhumvit 31, the second campus is at Sukhumvit 64 and Anglo Nakhon Ratchasima being the third.

History 
The school opened in 2003 with four students in its one-block Soi Sukhumvit 31 campus. The school stated that the site was chosen  because of its "central yet secluded environment." Its second campus opened by 2011, and by then the school had over 500 students from over 20 countries of origin. The Nakhon Ratchasima facility is scheduled to open in August 2014.

Locations 
Campus 31 is in the Watthana District of Bangkok. The school states that the original campus "maintains its natural rustic beauty that is close to nature".

Campus 64 is in Phra Khanong District, Bangkok. It is in proximity to the BTS Skytrain Punnawithi Station. The school describes the campus, which serves Kindergarten through Junior college, as "a purpose-built school".

Its Nakhon Ratchasima campus is in Nakhon Ratchasima in the Isan region.

Curriculum 
Anglo Singapore International School offers a holistic education based on the Singapore Curriculum Framework leading to the Cambridge IGCSE/AS/A-Level exams. Students will complete an intensive educational programme while fully immersed within a tri-lingual environment – all individuals will retain fluency in English, mother tongue (Mandarin Chinese, Japanese, and Korean) and Thai.

Accreditation and affiliations 

 Licensed by Ministry of Education (Thailand)
 Licensed by Cambridge International Examinations  to offer learning and conduct examinations for IGCSE and  A/AS Level
 Licensed testing center for BMAT, TSA, PAT, MAT, STEP, MLAT, Classics Admissions Test (CAT) & Oriental Languages Aptitude Test (OLAT)
 Accredited by the Council of International Schools, Western Association of Schools and Colleges and ONESQA
 Member of International Schools Association of Thailand

Scholarships 
The following are scholarships available at Anglo Singapore International School: 
 Professor Yeap Ban Har Scholarship Programme
 Debate Scholarship Programme
 Academic Scholarship Programme
 Performing Arts Scholarship Programme
 Athletic Scholarship Programme

Events 

Anglo Singapore International School hosted the 3rd Thailand World Debating Championship in 2012.

In 2013, ANGLO launched the Asia World Schools Debating Championship tournament series.

References

External links 

 Anglo Singapore International School - Campus 31
 Anglo Singapore International School - Campus 64
 Anglo Singapore International School - Korat Campus
 Anglo Singapore Parents Support Group Website

Schools accredited by the Western Association of Schools and Colleges
International schools in Bangkok

Educational institutions established in 2003
2003 establishments in Thailand
Private schools in Thailand
Cambridge schools in Thailand
Singaporean international schools in Thailand